Warblington railway station serves the Warblington and Denvilles suburbs of Havant in Hampshire.

It is located on the West Coastway Line which runs between Brighton and Southampton,  from Brighton. Situated opposite Warblington School, the station lies very close to a major road junction: the point at which the A259 coast road leaves the A27. Standing on the platform at the station entrance end it is possible to see the platforms of Havant railway station a short straight-line distance away.

History
Other stations were opened later, several coinciding with the introduction of steam rail-motor services between Portsmouth and Chichester by the London, Brighton and South Coast Railway on 11 June 1906. One such station, named Denville Halt, was opened on 1 November 1907; the following month this was renamed Warblington Halt. On 5 May 1969 it was simplified to Warblington.

Services 
All services at Warblington are operated by Southern using  and  EMUs.

The typical off-peak service on Mondays to Saturdays in trains per hour is:

 1 tph to 
 1 tph to 

During the peak hours, there are additional services to Brighton via Worthing, London Victoria via Horsham, Southampton Central and Portsmouth Harbour.

The typical service on Sundays is:

 1 tph to Brighton via Worthing
 1 tph to Portsmouth Harbour

Gallery

References

External links 

Railway stations in Hampshire
DfT Category E stations
Former London, Brighton and South Coast Railway stations
Railway stations in Great Britain opened in 1907
Railway stations served by Govia Thameslink Railway